Phrynocephalus frontalis, the Shansi toadhead agama, is a species of agamid lizard endemic to China.

References

frontalis
Reptiles of China
Endemic fauna of China
Reptiles described in 1876
Taxa named by Alexander Strauch